The 1997 American League Championship Series (ALCS) pitted the Cleveland Indians, who won coming back against the defending World Series champion New York Yankees in the AL Division Series, and the Baltimore Orioles, who went wire-to-wire and beat the Seattle Mariners in the Division Series. In a role reversal from their 1996 ALDS encounter, the Indians stunned the Orioles, winning on bizarre plays or remarkable comebacks, and won the Series four games to two, but went on to lose to the Florida Marlins in the well-fought, seesaw, seven-game battle of the 1997 World Series. The Orioles had home field advantage, which was predetermined and assigned to either the East Division champions or their opponents in the Division Series.

Summary

Baltimore Orioles vs. Cleveland Indians

Game summaries

Game 1
Wednesday, October 8, 1997, at Oriole Park at Camden Yards in Baltimore, Maryland

The Orioles grabbed an early 1–0 series lead on the strong performance by starting pitcher Scott Erickson who gave up four hits, all singles, over eight innings of work.  The Indians only got one runner to second base offensively.  On the other hand, Orioles center-fielder Brady Anderson took Indians starter Chad Ogea's first offering in the bottom of the first out of the park, giving the Orioles a 1–0.  In the bottom of the third Anderson's double was followed by a Roberto Alomar home run, giving Erickson a 3–0 cushion.  Randy Myers pitched a clean ninth inning for the save.

Game 2
Thursday, October 9, 1997, at Oriole Park at Camden Yards in Baltimore, Maryland

In Game 2, Charles Nagy and Jimmy Key matched up for a much-needed win. Key allowed a two-run homer to Manny Ramírez in the top of the first. Nagy would also allow a two-run homer in the bottom of the second to Cal Ripken Jr. Then Mike Bordick hit the go-ahead two-run single off Nagy in the sixth that knocked Nagy out of the game. With the Tribe trailing 4–2 in the top of the eighth inning, two walks put two men on with two out. Armando Benítez faced Marquis Grissom and Grissom would deliver with a series-altering three-run homer that gave the Indians a 5–4 lead. That lead would stand as the Cleveland bullpen kept the Orioles scoreless to even the series at a game apiece.

Game 3
Saturday, October 11, 1997, at Jacobs Field in Cleveland, Ohio

With the Series even at 1-1, Orel Hershiser dueled with Orioles pitcher Mike Mussina at Jacobs Field. In this game, Mussina would set an LCS record with 15 strikeouts (which would be matched by Liván Hernández in the NLCS the very next day). The Indians held a 1–0 lead into the ninth, but José Mesa blew the save after Marquis Grissom lost a fly ball from Brady Anderson in the lights and the game went to extra innings. With Randy Myers on the mound for Baltimore in the bottom of the 12th, Marquis Grissom walked, then a single by Tony Fernández moved him to third. With one out, Omar Vizquel motioned to bunt. When the pitch came, it passed through the strike zone, with Vizquel apparently missing the ball.  The ball got away from Orioles catcher Lenny Webster, allowing Grissom to score the winning run. Webster and Myers thought the ball was fouled off and did nothing to stop Grissom, but the ball was not ruled foul. Although Orioles manager Davey Johnson argued the call, the umpire's call stood.

Game 4
Sunday, October 12, 1997, at Jacobs Field in Cleveland, Ohio

Scott Erickson returned to the mound against Indians starter Jaret Wright. After being given an early 1–0 lead, Erickson allowed a two-run homer to Sandy Alomar Jr. However, the Orioles scored four more runs off Wright to build a 5–2 lead. The Indians closed to within two in the fourth, but in the fifth, an even more bizarre play than Vizquel's missed bunt occurred. After giving up two more runs, Erickson was relieved by Arthur Rhodes with two Indians on base and two outs. Rhodes threw a wild pitch with Grissom at bat, allowing David Justice to score from third. However, he collided with Rhodes at home, and home plate umpire Durwood Merrill obscured Lenny Webster's view of the ball. Merrill motioned for someone to get the ball as Sandy Alomar also scored. Now down 2 runs, Baltimore would score a run in the 7th. The Orioles would tie the game in the ninth inning again off José Mesa. Sandy Alomar singled in the winning run in the bottom of the ninth, giving the Indians an 8–7 win as well as a three games to one lead in the Series.

Game 5
Monday, October 13, 1997, at Jacobs Field in Cleveland, Ohio

With the Orioles facing elimination they took a 2–0 lead in the third inning when right-fielder Gerónimo Berroa singled with the bases loaded off Cleveland starter Chad Ogea.  From there Orioles starter Scott Kamieniecki held the Indians scoreless through five innings.  Jimmy Key then turned in three scoreless innings in relief of Kamieniecki, who left the game due to elbow stiffness.  Indians reliever Paul Assenmacher allowed four hits and two runs, including a home run by Eric Davis, in the ninth inning to stretch the Baltimore lead to 4–0.  Orioles closer Randy Myers allowed RBI doubles to Matt Williams and Tony Fernández in the bottom of the ninth, but the Orioles held on for a 4–2 win, sending the series back to Baltimore.

Game 6
Wednesday, October 15, 1997, at Oriole Park at Camden Yards in Baltimore, Maryland

Charles Nagy and Mike Mussina kept the game scoreless and the game proceeded to the 11th inning. In the 11th, Tony Fernández, who hit a batting practice ball that bruised Bip Roberts' thumb (and, as a result, replaced Roberts at second base), hit a home run that gave the Indians a 1–0 lead. With two outs in the bottom half of the 11th, Brady Anderson singled to right off José Mesa. With Anderson on as the tying run, Roberto Alomar came up to bat. Alomar struck out looking on a pitch that appeared inside at first but came back across the plate. This gave Cleveland the out and the trip to the World Series.

Composite box
1997 ALCS (4–2): Cleveland Indians over Baltimore Orioles

Aftermath
As Davey Johnson had a porous relationship with Reds owner Marge Schott, which led to his ousting as manager despite success, the same situation would occur in Baltimore. The relationship between Johnson and owner Peter Angelos had always seemed poor, but it hit a boiling point in April 1997 when Johnson fined Roberto Alomar for missing a team banquet and that Alomar's fine would go to Johnson's wife's charity. Angelos let it be known that he was considering firing Johnson for the Alomar fine, believing his conduct to not be appropriate. After just two successful seasons that to led to Baltimore's first back-to-back postseason appearances since 1973-1974, Johnson offered his resignation by fax (after failing to reach owner Angelos by phone), which Angelos accepted on the same day that Johnson was named the 1997 American League Manager of the Year on November 5. The Orioles hired  Ray Miller as manager for the 1998 season, but the team would not have another winning season, let alone garner a postseason berth, until 2012.

Roberto Alomar joined his brother Sandy in Cleveland a year later, via free agency. Despite just three seasons in Baltimore, Alomar was a key figure in the Orioles resurgence in the mid 1990s. On August 3, 2013, Alomar was inducted into the Baltimore Orioles Hall of Fame, two years after being inducted into the National Baseball Hall of Fame.

References

External links
 1997 ALCS at Baseball-Reference.com

American League Championship Series
Cleveland Indians postseason
Baltimore Orioles postseason
American League Championship Series
American League Championship Series
American League Championship Series
1990s in Baltimore
1990s in Cleveland
American League Championship Series